The Sandon tornado struck the township of Sandon, Victoria, Australia on 13 November 1976.  The tornado is likely to have been an F3 on the Fujita scale.  It killed two people when their parked car was picked up and lifted around 9 metres off the ground and thrown 100 metres into a ditch.

See also 
List of tornadoes and tornado outbreaks
List of Southern Hemisphere tornadoes and tornado outbreaks

References

External links 
 Sketch and brief information of the Sandon Tornado
 Photos of the tornado and damage
 Damage photo in the Fairfax archive (search for Sandon to find more)
 Transcripts of contemporary newspaper reports

1976 in Australia
Tornadoes in Australia
Tornadoes of 1976
November 1976 events in Australia